Pádraig MacNamee (1896–1975), originally from Carrickasticken Road, Forkhill, County Armagh was the 13th president of the Gaelic Athletic Association (1938-1943).

A lifelong Irish language enthusiast, who worked as an examiner for the Northern Ireland Education Board, MacNamee was the first Ulsterman to serve as president of the GAA.

MacNamee is best remembered as the president of the GAA at the time of the removal of Douglas Hyde as patron of the GAA. This was not an easy decision, particularly as Hyde had done so much to promote the Irish language, an issue close to MacNamee’s heart.

In his honour, each year the GAA presents the McNamee awards for excellence in the areas of communication, public relations and journalism, specifically in relation to the GAA.

References

 

1896 births
1975 deaths
Alumni of De La Salle Teacher Training College, Waterford
Presidents of the Gaelic Athletic Association
Sportspeople from County Antrim